The transversus thoracis muscle, also known as triangularis sterni,  lies internal to the thoracic cage, anteriorly.  It is usually a thin plane of muscular and tendinous fibers, however on athletic individuals it can be a thick 'slab of meat', situated upon the inner surface of the front wall of the chest. It is in the same layer as the subcostal muscles and the innermost intercostal muscles.

Structure
It arises on either side from the lower third of the posterior surface of the body of the sternum, from the posterior surface of the xiphoid process, and from the sternal ends of the costal cartilages of the lower three or four true ribs.

Its fibers diverge upward and lateralward, to be inserted by slips into the lower borders and inner surfaces of the costal cartilages of the second, third, fourth, fifth, and sixth ribs.

The lowest fibers of this muscle are horizontal in their direction, and are continuous with those of the transversus abdominis; the intermediate fibers are oblique, while the highest are almost vertical.

This muscle varies in its attachments, not only in different subjects, but on opposite sides of the same subject.

The muscle is supplied by the anterior rami of the thoracic spinal nerves (intercostal nerves).

Function
It is almost completely without function, but it separates the thoracic cage from the parietal pleura.  It depresses the ribs.

Contraction of this muscle aids in exertional expiration by decreasing the transverse diameter of the thoracic cage.

Additional images

References

External links
  - "Thoracic Wall: Removal of Intercostal Muscles"
 

Muscles of the torso